The 1963 New Mexico State Aggies football team was an American football team that represented New Mexico State University as an independent during the 1963 NCAA University Division football season. In its sixth year under head coach Warren B. Woodson, the team compiled a 3–6–1 record and was outscored by a total of 209 to 158.

Woodson was later inducted into the College Football Hall of Fame.

Schedule

References

New Mexico State Aggies
New Mexico State Aggies football seasons
New Mexico State Aggies football team